Cuba is a city in Fulton County, Illinois, United States. The population was 1,294 at the 2010 census, down from 1,418 at the 2000 census.

History
Cuba was founded in 1837 when the two rival towns of Centerville and Middleton merged. The new town was named after the island of Cuba. A post office has been in operation at Cuba since 1837.

Geography
Cuba is located near the geographic center of Fulton County at  (40.493422, -90.193307). Illinois Route 97 passes through the city, leading north  to Galesburg and south  to Havana on the Illinois River.

Demographics

As of the census of 2000, there were 1,418 people, 552 households, and 384 families residing in the city. The racial makeup of the city was 98.45% White, 0.21% African American, 0.07% Native American, 0.14% Asian, 0.14% from other races, and 0.99% from two or more races. Hispanic or Latino of any race were 0.56% of the population.

There were 552 households, out of which 30.1% had children under the age of 18 living with them, 54.5% were married couples living together, 12.3% had a female householder with no husband present, and 30.4% were non-families. 27.0% of all households were made up of individuals, and 13.0% had someone living alone who was 65 years of age or older. The average household size was 2.48 and the average family size was 2.98.

In the city, the population was spread out, with 25.9% under the age of 18, 7.5% from 18 to 24, 26.2% from 25 to 44, 21.2% from 45 to 64, and 19.3% who were 65 years of age or older. The median age was 38 years. For every 100 women, there were 86.3 men.  For every 100 women age 18 and over, there were 82.5 men.

The median income for a household in the city was $30,682, and the median income for a family was $35,952. Men had a median income of $31,522 versus $19,519 for women. The per capita income for the city was $16,608. About 8.4% of families and 9.8% of the population were below the poverty line, including 10.7% of those under age 18 and 6.9% of those age 65 or over.

Notable people
Paul H. Landis, sociologist born in Cuba in 1901
Harry K. Newburn, educator born in Cuba

References

External links

Community Unit School District #3, Fulton County, Illinois

Cities in Illinois
Cities in Fulton County, Illinois
1837 establishments in Illinois